International Military Education and Training (IMET) is the title of a United States security assistance program, a type of student exchange program.

History 
Congress established the IMET program in the International Security Assistance and Arms Export Control Act of 1976 (Pub. L. No. 94-329, June 30, 1976), which amended the Foreign Assistance Act of 1961 (Pub. L. No. 87-195, Sept. 4, 1961). The policies underlying this program are directed by the United States Department of State's Bureau of Political-Military Affairs and the constituent projects are administered by the United States Department of Defense.

Mission 
The mission of the IMET is to enhance regional stability through mutually beneficial military-to-military relations.

Projects under the program include, but are not limited to, invitations for officers from foreign countries to attend various military schools in the United States, such as the U.S. Army War College or the National Defense University, as well as providing funding for trainers to travel to foreign countries to provide specific, localized training. Topics of instruction are varied and range from English language classes to familiarization training with human rights concepts and the law of war. A complete list of topics varies by year, and may encompass several hundred distinct courses.

Operations 
In December 2019, the Department of Defense had 5,181 foreign students from 153 countries for security training. Saudi Arabia was restricted due to the Naval Air Station Pensacola shooting. Pakistan was reinstated into the program, following its suspension in August 2018 as part of the Trump administration's pressure to have it crack down on Islamist militants.

See also
United States Security Assistance Organizations
United States Army Security Assistance Command
Defense Security Cooperation Agency
Foreign Assistance Act

References

External links
 U.S. Department of State Political-Military Affairs Bureau
 Defense Security Cooperation Agency

1976 establishments in the United States
IMET
IMET
Bilateral military relations of the United States